Cantarell is the default typeface supplied with the user interface of GNOME since version 3.0, replacing Bitstream Vera and DejaVu. The font was originated by Dave Crossland in 2009.

Operating systems that ship GNOME (version 3 and later versions) include this typeface family by default, such as Fedora Linux, and Red Hat Enterprise Linux includes the font family in its Google Fonts directory, making the typeface available for use in Web sites. It is notably absent in Ubuntu which includes the Ubuntu typeface instead.

History
In 2009 the Cantarell fonts were initially designed by Dave Crossland during his studies of typeface design at the University of Reading. In 2010, the fonts were chosen by GNOME for use in its 3.0 release, and the font sources were moved to GNOME's Git repository. The fonts are maintained there, allowing contributions from a variety of designers including Jakub Steiner and Pooja Saxena. In 2013 Pooja Saxena joined the GNOME foundation's “Outreach Programme for Women” internship, and was tasked with improving the design and language support. In 2014 Pooja was given financial support by Google Fonts to extend the design to Devanagari, but due to unavoidable vertical metrics adjustments the family was published with a new name, Cambay.

In GNOME 3.28 (March 2018), the font was re-designed with two additional weights, light and extra bold.

Criticism
Cantarell initially received both criticism and support from the free software community. It was argued that GNOME's use of Cantarell reduced legibility in desktop applications, it was not kerned and has deformed glyphs. Other users enjoyed the design, calling it “stylish and beautiful, but most importantly, crisp and easy to read.” The initial release notes stated that it was designed for legibility on screens.

GNOME's choice was also criticized since Cantarell only supports some Latin languages, far fewer than the previously used DejaVu fonts. When the fonts were first published, Crossland invited others to extend the language support and this finally began in 2013 when Saxena began applying the design to the Cyrillic script.

Cantarell does not include native italics or oblique glyphs.

See also
 Adwaita (design language) – design language of GNOME, which uses Cantarell as its default typeface

References

External links
 Cantarell source code
 Google Fonts Cantarell
 Google Fonts Cambay

Humanist sans-serif typefaces
Open-source typefaces
GNOME
Typefaces and fonts introduced in 2009